Andrei Alekseevich Martemyanov (born March 30, 1963) is retired Soviet and Russian ice hockey player and coach. He was head coach of KHL club, Avtomobilist Yekaterinburg. He is the current coach for HC Sibir

Played  for junior and youth teams of the Soviet Union.   USSR Champion 1984 with HC CSKA Moscow. Winner of  1989 Winter Universiade.

References

External links
 

1963 births
Living people
Sportspeople from Yekaterinburg
Russian ice hockey coaches
Russian ice hockey defencemen
Soviet ice hockey defencemen
HC CSKA Moscow players
HDD Olimpija Ljubljana players
Kölner Haie players
EC Ratinger Löwen players
Metallurg Magnitogorsk players
HC CSK VVS Samara players